Serhiy Melnyk (born 25 June 1993) is a professional Ukrainian football striker.

Club career
Melnyk was born in the Crimea and in early age he became attended the Sportive youth school of SC Tavriya Simferopol. His first trainer was Vyacheslav Portnov. 

Melnyk made his debut for SC Tavriya Simferopol played in the second time against FC Chornomorets Odesa on 3 May 2013 in the Ukrainian Premier League.

References

External links

1993 births
Living people
Association football forwards
Ukrainian footballers
Ukrainian Premier League players
SC Tavriya Simferopol players
FC Krymteplytsia Molodizhne players
Crimean Premier League players
Sportspeople from Simferopol